Elyasabad (also Romanized as Elyāsābād and Elīāsābād) is a village in Qarah Chaman Rural District, Arzhan District, Shiraz County, Fars Province, Iran. At the 2006 census, its population was 268, in 71 families.

References 

Populated places in Shiraz County